David Bolt may refer to:

David Bolt (civil servant), Independent Chief Inspector of Borders and Immigration
David Bolt (disability studies), professor of disability studies
David Bolt (novelist) (1927–2012), English novelist
David Bolt, mayor of Lakeview Heights, Kentucky 
David Bolt, founder of Bolteløkka in St. Hanshaugen, Oslo, Norway
David Bolt (bowls) (born 1973), English bowls international